Pacocollo also known as Chancane (possibly from Aymara ch'ankha wool cord, -ni a suffix to indicate ownership, "the one with a cord"), is a  mountain in the Andes of southern Peru. It is located in the Moquegua Region, Mariscal Nieto Province, Carumas District, and in the Tacna Region, Candarave Province, Candarave District. Pacocollo lies west of a lake named Pasto Grande or Ajuachaya and Wila Wilani.

References

Mountains of Moquegua Region
Mountains of Tacna Region
Mountains of Peru